Holiday Foreplay is an extended play (EP) by American hard rock band L.A. Guns. Released in November 1991 by Polydor Records, it features one track from the band's third album Hollywood Vampires, three previously unreleased live recordings from shows on the album's promotional tour, and a short holiday message from the band's frontman Phil Lewis. The album was a promotional release, and was not made available for widespread retail purchase.

Background
Released in November 1991, Holiday Foreplay includes one track from the studio album Hollywood Vampires ("Dirty Luv"), three live recordings from the album's promotional tour ("Some Lie 4 Love", "Rip and Tear" and "Sex Action"), and a 12-second holiday message from L.A. Guns lead vocalist Phil Lewis. The previously unreleased tracks, produced and mixed by Biff Dawes, were recorded at two shows during the summer: "Some Lie 4 Love" on August 31, 1991 at Sunken Gardens in San Antonio, Texas, and "Rip and Tear" and "Sex Action" on September 14, 1991 at Irvine Meadows Amphitheatre in Irvine, California.

Reception
Reviewing the Holiday Foreplay EP, The Hard Report claimed that "The live tracks are cool, but it's still hard to capture the energy and excitement of their live set", adding that "these live tracks give you a little insight into the rawness of it" due to the lack of "studio gloss" added in their production. Tracks from the EP reportedly received a lot of radio play, making it onto the publication's "Most Added Metal" list and later its "Hard Hitters" chart.

Track listing

Personnel
L.A. Guns
Phil Lewis – lead vocals
Tracii Guns – lead guitar, backing vocals
Mick Cripps – rhythm guitar, backing vocals
Kelly Nickels – bass, backing vocals
Steve Riley – drums, percussion, backing vocals
Additional personnel
Michael James Jackson – production and recording (track 1)
Biff Dawes – recording, engineering and mixing (tracks 2–4)
Maxine Miller – illustration

References

External links

1991 EPs
L.A. Guns EPs
Polydor Records EPs
Live EPs
Christmas EPs